This is a compilation of every international soccer game played by the United States men's national soccer team from 1916 through 1949. It includes the team's record for that year, each game and the date played. It also lists the U.S. goal scorers.

The format is: home team listed first, U.S. listed first at home or neutral site.

Records are in win–loss–tie format. Games decided in penalty kicks are counted as ties, as per the FIFA standard.

1916

1917-1923

1924

1925

1926

1927

1928

1929

1930

1931-1933

1934

1935

1936

1937

1938-1946

1947

1948

1949

See also
United States at the FIFA World Cup

References

External links
 USA - Details of International Matches 1885-1969
 USA Men's National Team: All-time Results, 1885-1989

1916
1916–17 in American soccer
1923–24 in American soccer
1924–25 in American soccer
1926–27 in American soccer
1927–28 in American soccer
1930–31 in American soccer
1933–34 in American soccer
1934–35 in American soccer
1936–37 in American soccer
1937–38 in American soccer
1947–48 in American soccer
1948–49 in American soccer
1949–50 in American soccer